The Rochester Twilight Criterium is an annual professional bicycle racing event on the National Criterium Calendar of USA Cycling.

The event, a fast race on a short loop along downtown streets in Rochester, New York, started in 2004. In 2008, it was expanded into a three-day event called the Rochester Omnium, with the Twilight Criterium as its centerpiece. In 2009, the event had been planned to expand to six days, at venues throughout the Finger Lakes region; the new event would be called the Tour de New York. However, the 2009 event, including the Twilight Criterium, was canceled due to financial considerations.

In 2015, the Twilight Criterium was restarted with the intent of resuming it as an annual event.

References
http://www.dailypeloton.com/displayarticle.asp?pk=13577
http://www.democratandchronicle.com/story/sports/2015/08/15/rochester-twilight-criteriums-triumphant-return/31801887/

External links
Official site

 Twilight Criterium
Cycle races in the United States
Recurring sporting events established in 2004
2004 establishments in New York (state)
Men's road bicycle races